Stacie Orrico is an American pop singer and lyricist.

American Society of Composers, Authors and Publishers, United States (ASCAP)

American Christian Music Awards

Billboard Music Award, United States

BMI Songwriter Award, World

Gospel Music Association, World

Grammy Awards, World

Juice TV Awards, NZ

MTV Video Music Awards Japan

Music Television, World

Victory Awards

References

External links
 Official website

Orrico, Stacie